Friulano, from Friuli, may refer to:

Friulano (language)
Friulano (grape)
Friulano (cheese), Canadian-Italian cheese